This is a list of museums in Portugal.

Aveiro

Aveiro City Museum
Casinha de Bonecas
Fábrica Centro Ciência Viva de Aveiro
Museu de Arte Nova
Visionarium (Portugal)

Braga

Biscainhos Museum
Braga Cathedral Treasure
D. Diogo de Sousa Museum
Image Museum
Museu da Cultura Castreja
Museu do Traje Dr. Gonçalo Sampaio
Museum Medina
Nogueira da Silva Museum
Pius XII Museum
Stringed Instruments Museum
Alberto Sampaio Museum

Coimbra

Academic Prison
Casa Museu Fernando Namora
Conímbriga
Erotic Art Museum of Coimbra
Exploratory - Living Science Center of Coimbra
Monastery of Santa Clara-a-Velha
Museo de Coimbra
Museu dos Transportes Urbanos de Coimbra
Museo del Agua
Museu da Santa Casa da Misericórdia de Coimbra
National Museum Machado de Castro
Science Museum of the University of Coimbra

Lagos
Centro Ciência Viva de Lagos
Mercado de Escravos
Museu Municipal Dr. José Formosinho 
Núcleo Museológico Rota da Escravatura

Leiria

Banco das Artes Galeria
Moinho do Papel
Museu de Cerâmica (Caldas da Rainha)
Museu Escolar
Museu da Imagem em Movimento
Museo de Leiría 
Museu do Sporting
José Malhoa Museum

Lisbon and Lisbon District

Cascais
Casa das Histórias Paula Rego
Casa de Santa Maria
Casa Sommer
Cascais Citadel Palace Museum
Condes de Castro Guimarães Museum
Museu Condes de Castro Guimarães 
Museum of Portuguese Music (Estoril)
Museum of the Sea, Cascais
Palácio da Cidadela
Palácio dos Condes da Guarda, Cascais
Santa Marta Lighthouse (Cascais) (and lighthouse museum)

Lisbon
Ajuda National Palace
Archaeological Museum of São Miguel de Odrinhas
Astronomical Observatory of Lisbon
Atelier-Museu Júlio Pomar
Beau-Séjour Palace
Berardo - Art Deco Museum
Berardo Collection Museum
Cadeia do Aljube
Carris Museum
Casa-Museu Dr. Anastácio Gonçalves
Casa-Museu Medeiros e Almeida
Calouste Gulbenkian Museum
Carmo Convent (Lisbon)
Casa dos Bicos
Centro de Apoio Social de Runa
Chiado Museum
Cordoaria Nacional
Electricity Museum (Lisbon) (since 2016 part of MAAT)
Ephemeral Museum
Fado Museum
Fort of Bom Sucesso
House Museum - Fundação Amália Rodrigues
Lisbon Army Museum
Macau Science and Culture Centre
Money Museum
Museum of Art, Architecture and Technology (former Electricity Museum)
Museu de Arte Popular
Museu Benfica
Museu da Comunicação
Museu da Guarda Nacional Republicana
Museu da Lourinhã
Museu da Marioneta
Museum of Portuguese Decorative Arts
Museum of the Presidency of the Republic
Museum of Saint Anthony
Museu de São Roque
National Museum of Ancient Art
National Archaeology Museum (Lisbon)
National Azulejo Museum
National Coach Museum
National Museum of Contemporary Art
National Museum of Costume 
National Museum of Ethnology 
National Music Museum
National Museum of Natural History and Science, Lisbon
National Railway Museum 
National Theatre and Dance Museum
National Museum Soares dos Reis
Navy Museum
Museum of the Orient
Palace of the Marquesses of Fronteira
Pavilhão do Conhecimento
Pharmacy Museum
Pimenta Palace
Rafael Bordalo Pinheiro Museum
Teatro Romano de Lisboa
Tejo Power Station

Sacavém
 Casa Museu José Pedro
 Ceramics Museum of Sacavém

Sintra
Museu Anjos Teixeira
Museu De Arte Moderna
Museu do Ar
Museu Ferreira de Castro
NewsMuseum
Sintra Natural History Museum

Marinha Grande
 Casa Museu Afonso Lopes Vieira
 Glass Museum of Marinha Grande (Portugal)
 Joaquim Correia Museum
 SB Museum of Glass Manufacturing

Porto

Amarante

Museu Municipal Amadeo de Souza Cardoso 
Museu Paroquial de Arte Sacra de S. Gonçalo de Amarante 
Sala-Museu do Rancho Folclórico da Casa do Povo de Figueiró

Baião

Museu Etnográfico de Baião
Museu Municipal de Arqueologia de Baião 
Museu Queiroziano - Casa de Tormes

Felgueiras

Museu da Casa do Assento 
Museu de Pão de LO
Santa Quitéria

Gondomar

Casa da Malta/Museu Mineiro – Fânzeres e São Pedro da Cova 
Museu de Arte Sacra da Paróquia de S. Cosme

Maia

Museu da Cidade da Maia 
Museu de História e Etnologia da Terra da Maia – Castelo da Maia (Maia)

Marco de Canaveses

Museu Municipal Carmen Miranda

Matosinhos

Casa-Museu Abel Salazar 
Casa-Museu Mártir São Sebastião 
Museu da Misericórdia 
Museu da Quinta de Santiago / Centro de Arte de Matosinhos 
Museu de Jazigos Minerais Portugueses do IGM – São Mamede de Infesta (Matosinhos)

Lousada

Museu Vivo doo Linho – Lousada

Paços de Ferreira

Museu Arqueológico da Citânia de Sanfins – Sanfins
Museu do Móvel

Porto

Arqueossítio D. Hugo n.º 5 — Sé (Porto)
Bank of Materials
Casa de Serralves — Fundação de Serralves (Lordelo do Ouro)
Casa do Infante — Núcleo Museológico do Museu do Porto  (São Nicolau (Porto))
Casa Museu Fernando de Castro — (Paranhos (Porto))
Casa-Museu Guerra Junqueiro —  Casa do Dr. Domingos Barbosa (Sé (Porto))
Casa-Museu Marta Ortigão Sampaio — Cedofeita
Casa Oficina António Carneiro — (Bonfim)
Centro Interpretativo do Património da Afurada
Eng. António de Almeida House Museum — (Ramalde)
FC Porto Museum
Fundação Maria Isabel Guerra Junqueiro e Luís Pinto Mesquita Carvalho — Casa dos Freires de Andrade (Sé (Porto))
Gabinete de Numismática — Palacete dos Viscondes de Balsemão — Núcleo Museológico do Museu do Porto  (Vitória)
Holocaust Museum of Oporto
House of Almeida Garrett
House of Filigree
Medical Museum of Human Anatomy
Museu de Arte Contemporânea de Serralves
Museu do Centro Hospitalar do Porto
Museu da Farmácia — (Ramalde)
Museum of Industry — (Ramalde)
Museum Marionetas do Porto
Museu da Venerável Ordem Terceira de São Francisco — Igreja da Venerável Ordem Terceira de São Francisco (São Nicolau)
Museu de Etnologia do Porto — Palácio de São João Novo (Miragaia)
Museum of Misericórdia of Porto
Museum of Natural History (University of Porto) — Reitoria da Universidade do Porto (Vitória)
Museu do Papel Moeda  — Fundação Dr. António Cupertino de Miranda (Aldoar)
Museum of Transport and Communication — Alfandega Nova (Miragaia)
Museu Militar do Porto — (Bonfim)
National Press Museum — (Campanhã)
Palácio das Artes
Palacete Ramos Pinto
Portuguese Centre of Photography — Cadeia da Relação (Vitória)
Museum of the School of Engineering (ISEP)  — Instituto Superior de Engenharia (Paranhos)
Porto Tram Museum — (Massarelos)
Port Wine Museum — Núcleo Museológico do Museu do Porto (Massarelos)
Puppet Museum
Romantic Museum of Quinta da Macieirinha — Núcleo Museológico do Museu do Porto  (Massarelos)
Sacred Art and Archaeology Museum — Convento dos Grilos (São Nicolau)
Soares dos Reis National Museum — Palácio dos Carrancas (Miragaia)
Tesouro da Sé — Sé do Porto (Sé)
World of Discoveries - Miragaia (Porto)
WOW Porto - The World of Wine

Póvoa de Varzim

A Filantrópica – Póvoa de Varzim
Ethnography and History Museum of Póvoa de Varzim – Póvoa de Varzim
Santa Casa Museum of Póvoa de Varzim

Santo Tirso

Museu de Arte Sacra de Santo Tirso - Santo Tirso
Museu Internacional de Escultura Contemporânea - Santo Tirso
Museu Municipal Abade Pedrosa - Santo Tirso

Trofa

Museu do Automóvel Antigo de Baptista Andrade – Trofa

Valongo

Museu da Ardósia – Valongo

Vila Nova de Gaia

Casa-Museu Teixeira Lopes / Galerias Diogo de Macedo – Vila Nova de Gaia
Museu das Pescas da Estação Litoral da Aguda – Vila Nova de Gaia
Museu de Ervamoira – Vila Nova de Gaia
Museu de Santa Maria Adelaide – Vila Nova de Gaia
Museu do Granito – Vila Nova de Gaia
Museu do Regimento de Artilharia da Serra do Pilar – Vila Nova de Gaia
Museu Sandeman do Vinho do Porto – Vila Nova de Gaia
Solar Condes de Resende – Vila Nova de Gaia

Santarém
 Wax Museum of Fátima – Fátima
 Museum of the Life of Christ – Fátima
 Museum of Sacred Art and Ethnology – Fátima

Setúbal
Dom Fernando II e Glória
Monastery of Jesus of Setúbal

Viana do Castelo
Cinema Museum of Melgaço
Geraz do Lima Carriage Museum

Vila Real
House of the County

Viseu
Grão Vasco Museum

See also 

List of museums
Tourism in Portugal
Culture of Portugal

Museums
 
Portugal
Museums
Portugal
Museums